Ngazibini Sigwili (born 12 June 1995) is a South African cricketer. He was part of South Africa's squad for the 2014 ICC Under-19 Cricket World Cup. He was included in the Eastern Province cricket team squad for the 2015 Africa T20 Cup.

References

External links
 

1995 births
Living people
South African cricketers
Eastern Province cricketers
Warriors cricketers
People from Mthatha
Cricketers from the Eastern Cape